John Abbot (fl. 1423) was an English politician who served as a Member of Parliament Weymouth in 1423. He was the son of John Abbot, another MP, and two of his brothers, Robert and William, were also MPs.

References

English MPs 1423
People from Weymouth, Dorset
Year of birth unknown
Year of death unknown